14 Days is the second release from Arkitekt, a side project of Noel Hogan, guitarist of The Cranberries, exclusively with Mono Band member Richard Walters. 14 Days was released on March 1, 2009 in the Republic of Ireland. Like their previous release, The Black Hair EP, demo versions of this EP's songs were made available, this time as streaming audio on their website. There is another, earlier demo of "Pacing" released with the demos from The Black Hair EP under the title "Track 34 (working demo)".

Track list

Streaming tracks

Band members
 Noel Hogan – guitar, programming, backing vocals
 Richard Walters – lead vocals
 Ken Rice – string arrangements

References

2009 EPs
Arkitekt EPs